Mirush Kabashi (born 17 April 1948) is an Albanian actor. He is a recipient of the Merited Artist of Albania award. He has interpreted over 100 characters in theatre and 20 in moving pictures.

See also

 List of Albanian actors
 List of people from Shkodër

References

External links
 

1948 births
20th-century Albanian male actors
21st-century Albanian male actors
Albanian male film actors
Albanian male stage actors
Albanian male television actors
Living people
Merited Artists of Albania
People from Shkodër